City of Angels is a 1976 American television series created by Stephen J. Cannell and Roy Huggins, who had previously worked together on The Rockford Files. American mystery novelist Max Allan Collins has called City of Angels "the best private eye series ever."

Plot
Wayne Rogers plays a determined but not wholly ethical private detective, Jake Axminster, who looks out for himself—and somewhat less aggressively for his clients—amid the corruption of Los Angeles, California, in the mid-1930s. He is aided in his investigative efforts by two friends: his ditzy blonde secretary, Marsha Finch (Elaine Joyce), who also runs a call-girl business on the side, and attorney Michael Brimm (Philip Sterling). Brimm is called upon frequently to defend Axminster from charges (mostly trumped-up) leveled against him by Lieutenant Murray Quint (Clifton James), a fat, cigar-chomping, and thoroughly crooked member of the Los Angeles Police Department.

Axminster drives a 1934 ragtop Studebaker and keeps his office in downtown L.A.’s historic Bradbury Building, phone number OXford-8704. (Brimm’s office is located just across the hall.) For his services, Axminster charges $25 a day plus expenses. Although Brimm describes him as “Mr. Play-It-Safe,” Axminster regularly places himself in danger by helping friends and annoying the police with his questions. His efforts frequently result in his being beaten up. So often does Quint order his thrashing, that Axminster has taken to having nude photographs shot of himself in order to prove later on how aggressive the cops were in their interrogations.

The detective drinks coffee addictively. When one client asks him whether his habit keeps him up, Axminster responds, “No, but it helps.” He appears to be constantly in debt, and he’s not above borrowing money from friends and even from his bootblack, Lester (Timmie Rogers). Axminster “gripes in general about the cost of staying alive. ‘All the angels left this burg about 20 years ago,’ is his succinct summation of the 1930s ...”

Background

Inspired by the 1974 film Chinatown, City of Angels adopted the same cynical view of Depression era Los Angeles, a place where Hollywood and crime competed for attention. This series also found its roots in Roy Huggins’ hard-boiled 1946 detective novel, The Double Take, which had earlier provided the source material for another Huggins-created series, 77 Sunset Strip. Individual installments of this show were based on real-life events. The three-part pilot episode, “The November Plan,” was based on a notorious 1933 American conspiracy known as the Business Plot, which involved wealthy businessmen trying to bring down United States President Franklin D. Roosevelt in a coup. Another episode, "The Castle of Dreams," featured a pricey brothel where the prostitutes were movie-star lookalikes. That establishment was based on the historical  T&M Studio (later fictionalized in L.A. Confidential as the "Fleur de Lis Club"). During the show's run, Nazism, communism, railroad-riding hoboes, and the Ku Klux Klan all figured into the plots.

Like Banyon, an earlier and similar American series set in Los Angeles, City of Angels was short-lived. Only 13 hour-long episodes were produced before NBC decided to cancel the program. Critics argued that the TV audience did not easily connect with Rogers as a tough, wise-cracking gumshoe. TV Guide'''s Cleveland Amory wrote: "Altogether, Mr. Rogers does not seem completely at home in his part, but he does assault the Bogart-style dialogue with appeal, if not aplomb. When, in the first episode, a starlet (Meredith Baxter Birney) can't afford to pay him, she offers him her rings and he says he'll have them appraised. 'You aren't very subtle,' she says. 'You want subtlety,' he says, 'it'll cost 10 bucks a day more.'"

Series co-creator Huggins was said to have thought Rogers was miscast. Meanwhile, Rogers had his own gripes. An "associate of his" was quoted in TV Guide as saying that "Wayne actually tore up Angels scripts while they were shooting on the set and rewrote them himself. He hated the material they gave him." That article continued:

Rogers says, "Angels is a classic example of convoluted, disconnected, bad storytelling." The show had share-of-audience figures of 50%, 31% and 29% for the first three episodes—certainly a respectable record for a mid-season replacement. "These were fine episodes, written by Steve Cannell," says Rogers. "After that, the others couldn't match Cannell's pace and the bottom fell out."

He mostly blames lack of story preparation time for the demise of Angels. "Often we'd have only an outline in hand, with the shooting deadline almost upon us. Sometimes we'd have a script only at the very last minute. I never heard of a show where you shot through the night and ran out of darkness, but that's what happened to us.

"The other big factor was that we'd see someone lost or murdered on page 1 of the script and Jake Axminster would be hired to handle the matter. Then we'd have 49 pages of red herrings. On page 50 we'd come back to the initial thesis. We were seeing non sequiturs all over the place. You can't get away with that."

Wayne Rogers was paid $25,000 a week for his starring role in City of Angels, his first series since departing from M*A*S*H the previous year.

The series' theme music was composed by Nelson Riddle.City of Angels was repeated on the A&E Network for several years beginning in 1990, and then made another brief appearance as part of a package of Universal series airing on TV Land, starting in 1999.

Episodes

Note that Roy Huggins is credited as a writer under his own name for episodes 1, 2, 3 and 9, and as "John Thomas James" for episodes 4, 6, 7, 8 and 11.

References

External links
 
 Shonk, Michael. “A TV Series Review: City of Angels (1976).” Mystery*File,'' April 16, 2012.

1976 American television series debuts
1976 American television series endings
1970s American crime television series
American detective television series
NBC original programming
Television series by Universal Television
Television series by Stephen J. Cannell Productions
Television series set in the 1930s
Television shows set in Los Angeles
Television series created by Stephen J. Cannell
Television series created by Roy Huggins